Jacques Bouveresse (20 August 1940 – 9 May 2021) was a French philosopher who wrote on subjects including Ludwig Wittgenstein, Robert Musil, Karl Kraus, philosophy of science, epistemology, philosophy of mathematics and analytical philosophy. Bouveresse was called "an avis rara among the better known French philosophers in his championing of critical standards of thought."

He was Professor Emeritus at the Collège de France where until 2010 he held the chair of philosophy of language and epistemology. His disciple Claudine Tiercelin was appointed to a chair of metaphysics and philosophy of knowledge upon his retirement.

Education and career
Born on 20 August 1940 in Épenoy in the Doubs département of France into a farming family, Jacques Bouveresse completed his secondary education at the seminary of Besançon. He spent two years of preparation for the baccalauréat in philosophy and scholastic theology at Faverney in Haute-Saône. He followed his preparatory literary classes at the Lycée Lakanal in Sceaux, and in 1961 entered the École Normale Supérieure in Paris.

He presented his doctoral thesis in philosophy on Wittgenstein, entitled "Le mythe de l'intériorité. Expérience, signification et langage privé chez Wittgenstein".

Beginning with his earliest works, he consistently constructed his own philosophical and intellectual path, without following the normal routes and modes of academia. In 1976, Wittgenstein was practically unknown in France, as were Musil and the logic and analytical philosophy which Bouveresse had begun to study in the 1960s. These two last domains notably propelled him towards the lectures of Jules Vuillemin and Gilles Gaston Granger, who at the time were practically alone in occupying themselves with these problems, and with whom he maintained a lasting friendship.
 
Academic career: 
 1966–1969: Assistant to the Section de Philosophie of the University of Paris (teaching logic)
 1969–1971: Maître-Assistant to the UER de Philosophie of the Université Paris I
 1971–1975: Attached to the CNRS
 1975–1979: Maître de Conférences at the Université Paris I
 1979–1983: Professor at the University of Geneva
 1983–1995: Professor at the University of Paris
 From 1995: Professor at the Collège de France in the chair of philosophie du langage et de la connaissance.

Works
Bouveresse's philosophy is a continuation of the intellectual and philosophical tradition of central Europe (Brentano, Boltzmann, Helmholtz, Frege, the Vienna Circle, Kurt Gödel). His philosophical programme is in nearly all respects similar to the one conducted by many present day Analytic philosophers.

The thought of Robert Musil
Jacques Bouveresse is interested in the thought of the early 20th-century Austrian novelist Robert Musil (who wrote a thesis on philosophy), famous for his novel The Man Without Qualities, as well as the aversion/fascination with which Paul Valéry regarded philosophy.

Incompleteness and philosophy
Apart from his work on Ludwig Wittgenstein, Jacques Bouveresse is interested in the incompleteness theorems of Kurt Gödel and their philosophical consequences. It is on this account that he has attacked, in a popular work Prodiges et vertiges de l'analogie, the use made of these theorems by Régis Debray. Bouveresse denounces the literary distortion of a scientific concept for the purpose of a thesis. This distortion, according to him, has no other purpose than to overwhelm a readership which lacks the training necessary to comprehend such complex theorems. Bouveresse's reproach to Debray is not that he uses a scientific concept for the purpose of an analogy, but that he uses such a difficult to understand theorem in the attempt to provide an absolute justification in the form of the classic sophism of the argument from authority.

According to Bouveresse, the incompleteness of a formal system which applies to certain mathematical systems in no way implies the incompleteness of sociology, which is not a formal system.

Bibliography (in French)
(Unless stated otherwise, published by Éditions de Minuit)
 1969: La philosophie des sciences, du positivisme logique in Histoire de la philosophie, vol. 4. Ed. François Châtelet 
 1971: La parole malheureuse. De l'Alchimie linguistique à la grammaire philosophique
 1973: Wittgenstein : la rime et la raison, science, éthique et esthétique
 1976: Le mythe de l'intériorité. Expérience, signification et langage privé chez Wittgenstein
 1984:  Le philosophe chez les autophages
 1984:  Rationalité et cynisme
 1987: La force de la règle, Wittgenstein et l'invention de la nécessité
 1988:  Le pays des possibles, Wittgenstein, les mathématiques et le monde réel
 1991: Philosophie, mythologie et pseudo-science, Wittgenstein lecteur de Freud, Éditions de l'éclat
 1991: Herméneutique et linguistique, suivi de Wittgenstein et la philosophie du langage, Éditions de l'éclat
 1993: L'homme probable, Robert Musil, le hasard, la moyenne et l'escargot de l'Histoire, Éditions de l'éclat
 1994:  'Wittgenstein', in Michel Meyer, La philosophie anglo-saxonne, PUF
 1995:  , Éditions Jacqueline Chambon
 1996: La demande philosophique. Que veut la philosophie et que peut-on vouloir d'elle ?, Éditions de l'Eclat
 1997: Dire et ne rien dire, l'illogisme, l'impossibilité et le non-sens, Éditions Jacqueline Chambon
 1998: Le Philosophe et le réel. Entretiens avec Jean-Jacques Rosat, Hachette
 1999: Prodiges et vertiges de l'analogie. De l'abus des belles-lettres dans la pensée, Éditions Liber-Raisons d'agir
 2000: Essais I - Wittgenstein, la modernité, le progrès et le déclin , Agone
 2001: Essais II - L'Epoque, la mode, la morale, la satire, Agone 
 2001: Schmock ou le triomphe du journalisme, La grande bataille de Karl Kraus, Seuil
 2003: Essais III : Wittgenstein ou les sortilèges du langage, Agone 
 2001: La voix de l'âme et les chemins de l'esprit , Seuil, coll. Liber
 2004: Bourdieu savant & politique, Agone
 2004: Langage, perception et réalité, tome 2, Physique, phénoménologie et grammaire, Ed. Jacqueline Chambon
 2004: Essais IV - Pourquoi pas des philosophes, Agone
 2005: Robert Musil. L'homme probable, le hasard, la moyenne et l'escargot de l'histoire, (new edition of 1993 above), Éditions de l'éclat 
 2006: Essais V - Descartes, Leibniz, Kant, Agone

References

External links
 Qu'appellent-ils « penser »? Bouveresse on the affaire Sokal and its consequences.
 Entretien paru dans l'Humanité (January 2004).
 Interview about Que peut-on faire de la religion? (December 2012).

1940 births
2021 deaths
People from Doubs
Lycée Lakanal alumni
École Normale Supérieure alumni
Academic staff of the Collège de France
Academic staff of the University of Paris
Academic staff of the University of Geneva
Analytic philosophers
Philosophers of language
Epistemologists
20th-century French philosophers
21st-century French philosophers
21st-century French writers
Légion d'honneur refusals
Philosophers of science
Philosophers of mathematics
Philosophers of social science
Critics of postmodernism
French male writers